Chataz (also known as Chanteh) is a village in Qezel Gechilu Rural District, in the Central District of Mahneshan County, Zanjan Province, Iran. At the 2006 census, its population was 162, in 41 families.

References 

Populated places in Mahneshan County